Dennis Scott may refer to:

Dennis Scott (basketball) (born 1968), American former basketball player
Dennis Scott (rugby league) (born 1976), Australian rugby league footballer
Dennis Scott (writer) (1939–1991), Jamaican poet, playwright, actor and dancer